General Sir John Aubrey Taylor Sharp  (6 September 1917 – 15 January 1977) was a British Army officer who achieved high office in the 1970s.

Military career
Sharp was educated at Repton School and Jesus College, Cambridge. He was commissioned into the Royal Artillery in 1938. He served in World War II with 5th Medium Regiment and then with 4th Regiment, Royal Horse Artillery. Along with many other officers he was awarded the Military Cross in 1942 and a bar to the MC in 1943, both "in recognition of gallant and distinguished services in the Middle East." He went to the Staff College at Quetta in India in 1944 and then became Personal Liaison Officer to Field Marshal Bernard Montgomery in 1945.

After the War he became an instructor at the Royal Military Academy, Sandhurst in 1947 advancing to Military Assistant to the Commander-in-Chief, Far East Land Forces in 1955.

He became Commanding Officer 1st Regiment Royal Horse Artillery in 1959 and Commander 11th Infantry Brigade Group in 1961. He went to the Imperial Defence College in 1963 and then became Commandant of the Royal School of Artillery at Larkhill in 1964. He was appointed General Officer Commanding 2nd Division within British Army of the Rhine in 1966 and Commandant of the Staff College, Camberley in 1967.

He was General Officer Commanding I Corps in 1970, Military Secretary in 1972 and lastly Commander-in-Chief, Allied Forces Northern Europe from 1974 up to his death in Oslo on 15 January 1977. In that capacity he had to deal with threats to Europe's Northern Flank from the Soviet Union.

Cricket
Sharp played first-class cricket for Leicestershire and Cambridge University in five matches between 1937 and 1946. His father, Aubrey Sharp, was a cricketer of greater renown, appearing in first-class cricket for Leicestershire between 1908 and 1935 and captaining the team in 1921 and part of 1922.

References

|-

|-
 

|-
 

|-

1917 births
1977 deaths
British Army generals
British Army personnel of World War II
Knights Commander of the Order of the Bath
Recipients of the Military Cross
Royal Artillery officers
Academics of the Royal Military Academy Sandhurst
English cricketers
Cambridge University cricketers
Leicestershire cricketers
People educated at Repton School
Alumni of Jesus College, Cambridge
People from Blaby
Graduates of the Staff College, Quetta
Commandants of the Staff College, Camberley
Military personnel from Leicestershire